Susan Joy Rattray (born 18 December 1953) is a New Zealand former  cricketer who played as an all-rounder, batting right-handed and bowling right-arm off break. She appeared in 9 Test matches and 15 One Day Internationals for New Zealand between 1975 and 1985. She also played 15 One Day Internationals for International XI at the two World Cups that they appeared at, in 1973 and 1982, and was the only player to appear for the side at both tournaments. She played domestic cricket for Canterbury and North Shore.

References

External links
 
 

1953 births
Living people
Cricketers from Christchurch
New Zealand women cricketers
New Zealand women Test cricketers
New Zealand women One Day International cricketers
International XI women One Day International cricketers
Canterbury Magicians cricketers
North Shore women cricketers